William Douglas Humia Menezes (born 1 March 1963), known as just Douglas, is a Brazilian former footballer. He played in eleven matches for the Brazil national football team in 1987. He was also part of Brazil's squad for the 1987 Copa América tournament.

References

External links
 

1963 births
Living people
Brazilian footballers
Brazil international footballers
Association football midfielders
Footballers from Belo Horizonte
Footballers at the 1987 Pan American Games
Pan American Games gold medalists for Brazil
Medalists at the 1987 Pan American Games
Pan American Games medalists in football